Senida Hajdarpašić (born 9 April 1985), known by her stage name Senidah (pronounced ), is a Slovenian singer-songwriter. Often dubbed the "Balkan Trap Diva" by the media, she was born in Ljubljana and rose to prominence as the lead singer of the band Muff. She rose to popularity across the former Yugoslavia upon the release of her solo single "Slađana" in March 2018. 

"Slađana" was included in her debut album Bez Tebe (2019). Between 2019 and 2021, she released a series of commercially successful standalone singles, including: "Mišići", "Kamikaza", "100%", "Replay" and "Dođi". Her second album Za Tebe (2022) was preceded by singles "Behute", "Jadnaja" and "Dva prsta".

Senidah has received seven nominations for the regional Music Awards Ceremony awards, winning two, in addition to the Golden MAC for Authenticity award in 2020.

Career

Early beginnings 
Senidah's singing talent was discovered by her sister, who would record her singing and post it on the internet.

In February 2011, Senidah released her debut R&B-influenced single "Pustinjom" (Through a Desert), but soon after joined electro soul-pop band Muff as the lead singer. Their first single "Naj sije v očeh" (Keep the Glow in the Eye) was awarded the song of the year in Slovenia. In March 2014, Muff took part in the preselection contest for Slovenia's representative at the Eurovision Song Contest 2014 with "Let Me Be (Myself)", finishing as the runner-ups to Tinkara Kovač and "Round and Round". Their debut eponymous album, released in November, was then declared the album of the year.

2018–2019: Breakthrough, "Slađana" and Bez Tebe 
In March 2018, Senidah released her solo trap single "Slađana" in Serbian to lackluster success. However, after being discovered by Serbian rappers and producers Reksona and Coby from the Belgrade-based hip-hop label Bassivity Digital, she accepted their offer to re-upload the music video to their official YouTube channel. Soon, "Slađana" went viral and has accumulated more than sixty million views. Senidah successfully continued collaborating with Bassivity, through which she released her following single "Belo" (White) in June. She was also featured on "4 strane sveta" (4 Sides of the World) by Coby as part of the soundtrack to Serbian film South Wind. At the last day of the year she released two more singles, titled "Bez tebe" (Without You) and "Nisi bio tu" (You Weren't Here).

In January the following year, Senidah won the Hip-Hop/Rap Song of the Year Award with "Slađana" at the 2019 Music Awards Ceremony. In March, she released a single in English, titled "Ride", under Universal Serbia, which had been recorded a couple of years prior. Her debut album, Bez Tebe, was eventually released on 25 March, entirely in Serbian.

2019–2021: "Mišići" and "100%" 
On 21 April, Senidah performed at the Bassivity Showcase event at the Belgrade Sports Hall, alongside Bassivity Digital collective. Senidah released "Mišići" (Muscles) and "Sve bih" (I Want Everything) featuring Atlas Erotika for FCKN A! in April and May, respectively. The former one saw great success, counting more than 75 million views on YouTube. That summer as a part of her tour, she also performed at Exit Gang and the Sea Dance Festival. In July, she co-wrote Đogani's single "Dodiri" (Touches). On 9 August, she released "202", again in English. In mid August, media started a rumour that Senidah was internally selected to represent Slovenia in the Eurovision Song Contest 2020; however, the rumour turned out to be false. She would later state that she would participate in the Eurovision Song Contest only if she would be able to represent the entire former Yugoslavia.

On 15 August, a new single "Kamikaza" (Kamikaze) by Bosnian rappers Jala Brat and Buba Corelli was released, featuring Senidah. The single was a great commercial success, charting on the Ö3 Austria Top 40. On 26 September, Austrian rapper RAF Camora posted a snippet of his upcoming collaboration with Senidah on his Instagram story. The song, titled "100%", was released on 28 November, alongside the music video that was shot in Barcelona, Spain. It peaked at number three in Austria and debuted at number 28 on the Official German Charts on 6 December, becoming the first song in any variant of Serbo-Croatian to enter the chart.

As of January 2020, Senidah is the first musician from the region to reach 700,000 monthly listeners on Spotify. On 27 January 2020, she performed "Mišići" live at the 2020 Music Awards Ceremony, as well as presented Oliver Mandić with the Career Achievement Award. Later in the night she won two awards herself, the Trap Song of the Year Award for "Mišići", presented to her by Jelena Karleuša, and a special Golden MAC for Authenticity Award that was awarded to her by the organizers' choice.

Despite the fact she denied it at the Music Awards Ceremony a month before, Telegraf reported in late February that Senidah collaborated with Bosnian musician Dino Merlin on a song. According to the media, Merlin wrote the song and they shot a music video in Istanbul. However, Senidah denied the rumours once again on Instagram Live. On 1 March, Senidah released the music video for "Samo uživaj" (Just Enjoy), shot at the Faculty of Pharmacy at the University of Belgrade. On 12 May, she released the music video for "Ko je" (Who Is It), directed and produced by the singer herself. The video was shot at the streets of Ljubljana, deserted due to the COVID-19 pandemic. Three days later, she released her new single "Piješ" (You're Drinking). In August 2020, she released new single "Viva Mahalla" (Long Live the Mahallah).

Senidah started her 2021 by releasing "Dođi" (Come), her highly anticipated duet with Dino Merlin. On 12 February, Senidah released a collaboration with her long-time collaborator and friend, producer Cazzafura, entitled "Deca techna" (Children of Techno). On 12 May, she released "Replay" in collaboration with the Italian fashion brand of the same name. The song represented a significant change in Senidah's sound, a switch from her usual trap sound to jazz-rock. The music video, released the same day, surpassed a million views within the first day. On 3 July, Senidah performed at the 20th annual Zagreb Pride in Ribnjak.

She concluded the year by releasing "Fama" (Fuss) on 24 December.

2022–present: Za Tebe 
Senidah started her 2022 by releasing her new single "Behute" (Haze) on 28 January. "Behute" entered Austrian and Swiss charts, becoming her third and second entry on the former and the latter, respectively. On 15 February 2022, "Behute" became the first song to top Billboard's newly introduced Croatia Songs chart, while debuting and peaking at number five on the Austria Songs chart. "Behute" was succeeded by singles "Jadnaja" (Poorme), "Druga strana" (Other Side), and "Play With Heart"—the lattermost of which served as the official anthem of Women's EHF Euro 2022—all within the first half of the year. In early July, it was confirmed that Senidah and Konstrakta would co-headline that year's EuroPride, held in Belgrade.

On 17 November 2022, Senidah took to Instagram to reveal the title, cover art and tracklist of her sophomore studio album Za Tebe (For You). It featured "Behute", "Jadnaja" and the third single "Dva prsta" (Two Fingers), which had been released on 2 November. The album was released a day later, on 18 November.

Image and artistry
Senidah is notable for her rapid rise to fame and critical acclaim in the former Yugoslavia. She is known for her specific vocals and singing style, with Novosti's Lujo Parežanin dubbing her a "terrificly convincing singer, so [convincing] that the majority of regional pop scene seems like a group of amateur singers after her"; as well as for her extravagant and androgynous appearance. Her fame in the former Yugoslavia led Red Bull's Vojkan Bećir to characterize her as "what once were Brena or Čola". Furthermore, due to her biographical "Yugoslav-Balkan arc: a Slovenian musician whose parents are Montenegrin Bosniaks, and whose music is released by [Belgrade-based] Bassivity", Parežanin stated that "she is not just a performer who happens to be extremely popular in the region [...]  – this destroyed and tortured region of ours belongs to her." Zvonimir Milaković of Story.hr credited her for "starting a new music wave with her song 'Slađana'."

When asked about who would be her American counterpart, Senidah named Alicia Keys "because of her emotion" and Mary J. Blige "because of her aggression", as well as Chris Brown "because of his stage presence". Senidah is also notable for blending R&B with Balkan folk music. She expressed her love of sevdah—stating that her favorite  is "Zapjevala sojka ptica" (Jay Bird Had Sung), and adding that she loves her stage name because it reminds her of the word—as well as her fascination with Bosnian sevdah musician Božo Vrećo. She also named Dino Merlin her influence, pointing out that he "gave her a lot both as a musician and a soul she can feel". She credited her late mother as her main songwriting inspiration.

Personal life
Senidah was born in Ljubljana, Slovenia. Her parents were Bosniaks from Bihor near Bijelo Polje, Montenegro. She lives on the route Ljubljana–Belgrade.

While answering fans' questions on the show Nešto drugačije, Senidah was asked about her sexuality to which she replied: "I love people. I don't look at who they are or what they are. It is only important that I find you okay and that's it. I love good people. Uncorrupted people." The response sparked debates about the singer's possible bisexuality. In an interview with the Serbian edition of Hello!, she said that rumours about her sexuality do not bother her and that "she's in a[n emotional] relationship with music".

On 15 May 2021, amidst the 2021 Israel–Palestine crisis, Senidah criticized the Government of Slovenia on Instagram for expressing support to Israel by hanging its flag on the Government Building alongside the flags of Slovenia and the European Union, stating that she was ashamed to be a Slovenian citizen.

Discography

 Bez Tebe (2019)
 Za Tebe (2022)

Awards and nominations

Notes and references

Notes

References

External links
Senidah at Discogs

1985 births
Living people
Musicians from Ljubljana
Slovenian people of Montenegrin descent
Slovenian people of Bosniak descent
Bosniaks of Montenegro
21st-century Slovenian women singers
Slovenian hip hop musicians
Alternative R&B musicians
Slovenian pop musicians
Sevdalinka